Sounding Brass was a pioneer phone-in programme presented by Gloria Hunniford on BBC Radio 2. Listeners were invited to choose a Christmas carol or hymn while a Salvation Army band, which included the famous Chalk Farm Band, stood by in the studio to play their requests live.  

The brass bands had a wide repertoire and were usually able to play a hymn tune within forty seconds of the request being made. A guest hymnologist was on-hand to explain the origin of the music and the background to the composition of the words.  Among the regular Bandmasters who appeared was Ray Steadman-Allen, the famous Salvation Army band composer. The programme was devised and first presented by Owen Spencer-Thomas on BBC Radio London in 1977. The programme ran until the mid-1990s. 

Its sister programme Sounding Brass Strikes Again, which featured top brass bands from across London, was broadcast on BBC Radio London from 2 August 1978.

References

See also
 List of UK radio programmes

BBC Radio 2 programmes
BBC Local Radio programmes
BBC Radio London programmes